Petrovskoye is a rural locality in Besedinsky Selsoviet Rural Settlement, Kursky District, Kursk Oblast, Russia. Population:

Geography 
The village is located on the Rat River (a right tributary of the Seym), 111 km from the Russia–Ukraine border, 19 km east of the district center – the town Kursk, 6 km from the selsoviet center – Besedino.

 Climate
Petrovskoye has a warm-summer humid continental climate (Dfb in the Köppen climate classification).

Transport 

The rural locality is situated 19 km from Kursk Vostochny Airport, 120 km from Belgorod International Airport and 184 km from Voronezh Peter the Great Airport.

References

Notes

Sources

Rural localities in Kursky District, Kursk Oblast